Canet-en-Roussillon is a commune and town in the French department of the Pyrénées-Orientales, administrative region of Occitania.

Geography 
Canet-en-Roussillon is located in the canton of La Côte Sableuse and in the arrondissement of Perpignan, to the east of Perpignan.

History 

The city walls were destroyed in the 19th century.

With the development of sea bathing, the first beach settlement for bathers of the coast of Pyrénées-Orientales was created by Louise Lombard in 1849. As soon as 1854 are established municipal laws to rule types of bathing suits and separated zones of sea bathing for men and women.

Government and politics

Mayors 
thumb|Signature of mayor Basile Darbon in 1910.

International relations 
Canet-en-Roussillon is twinned with:
 Maynooth, Ireland

Population

Sites of interest 

 The medieval castle ;
 The Saint-James church ;
 The Château de l'Esparrou, a 19th c. manor ;
 The old village ;
 The sea front.

Notable people 
 Arlette Franco (1939-2010), mayor of Canet-en-Roussillon, deputy to the National Assembly of France and vice-president of the French Swimming Federation.
 Marc Fontan (1956-), motorcycle road racer born in Canet-en-Roussillon.

See also 
Communes of the Pyrénées-Orientales department
XL Airways Germany Flight 888T - An air crash that happened 7 kilometers from the commune.

References

External links 
 

Communes of Pyrénées-Orientales
Seaside resorts in France